Sadıqlı or Sadykhly may refer to:
Sadıqlı, Agstafa, Azerbaijan
Sadıqlı, Tovuz, Azerbaijan